Suor Barbara Ragnoni (1448–1533) was an Italian artist for whom only one work remains extant.

Her signed painting, The Adoration of the Shepherds, is now in the Pinacoeteca of Siena. The style of the painting, with its warm colors, is very much in keeping with the late quattrocento style.

References

 Women Painters of the World, Page 35

Italian women painters
Year of death unknown
Year of birth unknown
15th-century Italian painters
15th-century women artists
1448 births
1533 deaths
Nuns and art